Jelena Kostanić Tošić (née Kostanić; born 6 July 1981) is a retired tennis player from Croatia.

On 26 July 2004, she reached a career-high singles ranking of world No. 32. On 4 October 2004, she reached her highest doubles ranking of No. 30. Kostanić Tošić won eight doubles titles on the WTA Tour and four singles and ten doubles titles on the ITF Women's Circuit. As a junior, she won the 1998 Australian Open.

Kostanić Tošić married Croatian table tennis player Roko Tošić on 8 July 2006 (until 6 January 2007 she competed as Jelena Kostanić).

At the 2008 Australian Open, Tošić was defeated in the first round by the eventual champion Maria Sharapova in straight sets.

Playing for Croatia Fed Cup team, Kostanić Tošić has a win–loss record of 19–20.

Her last professional tournament was the 2010 US Open.

Personal
Jelena started playing tennis at age seven. She was eventually coached by Alan Maric; off-court trainer was Slaven Hrvoj. Father Slobodan is an external bank auditor; mother Smiljana is a dental nurse; sister Marina is a student of economics. Entire family plays recreational tennis on private court.

WTA career finals

Singles: 3 (3 runner-ups)

Doubles: 16 (8 titles, 8 runner-ups)

ITF finals

Singles: 10 (4–6)

Doubles: 12 (10–2)

Grand Slam performance timelines

Singles

Doubles

References

External links
 
 
 

1981 births
Living people
Australian Open (tennis) junior champions
Croatian female tennis players
Olympic tennis players of Croatia
Tennis players from Split, Croatia
Tennis players at the 2004 Summer Olympics
Wimbledon junior champions
Grand Slam (tennis) champions in girls' singles
Grand Slam (tennis) champions in girls' doubles